The OR Tambo Regiment (formerly Regiment Oos Rand) is a reserve infantry regiment of the South African Army.

History

Origin
In the period before 1960, 4 military units existed on the East Rand:
7 Medium Artillery Regiment,
2 Light Anti-Aircraft Regiment,
Regiment Kemp (an armoured regiment) and 
Regiment Andries Pretorius (a motorised infantry battalion)

With the re-organisation of the military, the four units were disbanded and Regiment Oos-Rand was formed from the integration of Regiment Kemp and Regiment Andries Pretorius. The April 1960 Government Gazette declared that Regiment Oos-Rand was activated on 1 January 1960 as a Citizen Force Unit.

Under the SADF
Just one week after it was activated, the regiment was mobilised for Operation Duiker and within 24 hours, 240 members were available. The regiments first Honorary Colonel was Senator C.C, Schabort on 9 August 1960. From 1976 to 1979, Regiment Oos-Rand called up members for the border war.

By September the unit received it regimental emblem. During 1962 the regiment was re-organised as a motorised infantry battalion and on 14 September 1963 it received its Colours.

Freedom of Benoni
The regiment received the Freedom of Benoni in 1967. 

The regiment received its ceremonial sword on 18 October 1969.

Operations
From 1983 onward, Regiment Oos-Rand was involved in internal stability and township control.

Motorised to Mechanised
In 1990 the regiment was converted to a mechanised infantry battalion.

Divisional Command
Regiment Oos-Rand was assigned to the command of 73 Brigade in this era.

Under the SANDF
Today  Regiment Oos-Rand, is  a typical reserve light infantry battalion.

Deployments
Regiment Oos-Rand is also involved with Operation Corona, a continuous anti poaching operation in the Kruger National Park.

Name change
In August 2019, 52 Reserve Force units had their names changed to reflect the diverse military history of South Africa. Regiment Oos Rand became the OR Tambo Regiment, and have 3 years to design and implement new regimental insignia. 

The regiment's new title is in honor of Oliver Tambo, who for many years served as the President of the African National Congress and was co-founder of uMkhonto we Sizwe.

Leadership

Regimental Symbols

Insignia

Previous Dress Insignia

Current Dress Insignia

Training
Regiment East Rand specialised in 81 mm Mortar platoons, Medics, Signals and Drivers

References 

Infantry battalions of South Africa
Infantry regiments of South Africa
Military units and formations in Benoni
Military units and formations in Germiston
Military units and formations established in 1960